Government Mustafabia Alia Madrasah is a government-run kamil (tertiary) madrasah in the Namazgor-Goyalgari area of Bogra in northern Bangladesh. The madrasha was established in 1925. It was named for Allama Mustafa Madani, who was the popular Islamic scholar at the time in British India. The former principal was Allama Abu Nasar Md. Nojibullah. The principal is Shaykh Mohammad Najrul Islam.

History 
Very popular pir of Furfura Sharif Mawlana Abu Bakr Siddiq (Rh.) was the founder of this renowned madrasa.

References

Madrasas in Bangladesh
1925 establishments in India
Organisations based in Bogra District
Alia madrasas of Bangladesh